TSS Snowdon was a steam turbine cargo vessel operated by the London and North Western Railway from 1902 to 1935.

History

She was built by Cammell Laird for the London and North Western Railway in 1902 and put on the Holyhead - Dublin route.

She was scrapped in 1935 at Port Glasgow.

References

1902 ships
Steamships
Ships built in Barrow-in-Furness
Ships of the London and North Western Railway